Tomorrow's Blues is an album by the band Colosseum that was released in 2003.

Track listing
"Tomorrow's Blues" (Clempson, Bell) – 6:41
"Come Right Back" (Greenslade) – 4:32
"In the Heat of the Night" (Quincy Jones, Alan Bergman, Marilyn Bergman) – 5:37
"Hard Times Rising" (Clempson, Brown) – 6:41
"Arena in the Sun" (Greenslade) – 3:25
"Thief in the Night" (Clempson, Brown) – 5:47
"Take the Dark Times With the Sun" (Greenslade) – 5:12
"The Net Man" (Greenslade) – 5:39
"Leisure Complex Blues" (Heckstall-Smith, Brown) – 5:12
"No Demons" (Greenslade) – 4:31

Personnel
Colosseum
Chris Farlowe - lead vocals (all but 9)
Dick Heckstall-Smith - saxophones
Dave "Clem" Clempson - guitar, backing vocals
Dave Greenslade - synthesizer, piano, Hammond organ
Mark Clarke - bass, backing and lead (9) vocals
Jon Hiseman - drums, cymbals

References

2003 albums
Colosseum (band) albums